The following outline is provided as an overview of and topical guide to the scientific method:

Scientific method – body of techniques for investigating phenomena and acquiring new knowledge, as well as for correcting and integrating previous knowledge. It is based on observable, empirical, reproducible, measurable evidence, and subject to the laws of reasoning.

Nature of scientific method 

Scientific method
 Science
 Philosophy of science
 Sociology of knowledge
 Process of science
 Knowledge

Elements of scientific method 

Research

Observation 

Observation
 Scientific method
 Causation
 Investigation
 Measurement

Hypothesis 

Hypothesis
 pro:Karl Popper 
Falsifiability
 con:Paul Feyerabend
 Statistical hypothesis testing

Experiment 

Experiment
 Laboratory
 Laboratory techniques
 Design of experiments
 Scientific control
 Natural experiment
 Observational study
 Field experiment
 Self-experimentation
 Self-experimentation in medicine
 Placebo effect

Theory
 Scientific theory

Prediction 
 Prediction 
Bayesian inference – subjective use of statistical reasoning
 Deductive reasoning
 Retrodiction

Evaluation by scientific community

 Peer review 
 Medical peer review

Scientific method concepts

Empirical methods 

Empirical methods
 Empiricism
 Robert Grosseteste
 Peter Parker
 Empirical validation
 Operationalization

Use of statistics 
 Uncomfortable science — Inference from a limited sample of data
 Exploratory data analysis 
 Confirmatory data analysis

Paradigm change 
Thomas Kuhn
 The Structure of Scientific Revolutions 
 Paradigm
 Paradigm shift

Problem of induction 
The problem of induction questions the logical basis of scientific statements.
 Inductive reasoning appears to lie at the core of the scientific method, yet also appears to be invalid.
 David Hume was the person who first pointed out the problem of induction.
 Karl Popper offered one solution, Falsifiability

Scientific creativity 
 Tacit knowledge

Deviations from the scientific method 
 Bad science
 Junk science
 Pseudoscience
 Pathological science
 Fringe science

Critique of scientific method 
 Paul Feyerabend argued that the search for a definitive scientific method was misplaced and even counterproductive.
 Imre Lakatos attempted to bridge the gap between Popper and Kuhn.
 Sociology of scientific knowledge
 Scientism

Relationship of scientific method to technology 

 Science and technology studies
 Theories of technology

Aesthetics in the scientific method 
 Elegance
 Occam's razor

History of scientific method

Publications
 Ibn al-Haytham's Book of Optics
 Avicenna's The Canon of Medicine
 Roger Bacon's Opus Majus
 Francis Bacon's Novum Organum

Persons influential in the development of scientific method 

 Alhazen
 Francis Bacon
 Galileo Galilei
 René Descartes
 Charles Sanders Peirce

See also 

 Bayesian probability
 Quasi-empirical methods
 Foundation ontology
 Ontology
 Philosophy of mathematics
 Mathematics
 Epistemology
 Post-processual archaeology is a methodological curiosity from Archaeology.
 Structuralism
  Post-structuralism
 Deconstruction
 Postmodernism
 Latour, Bruno
 Secularism-
 Physical law
 Science policy
 Scientific Revolution
 Sociology of knowledge
 Science studies

External links

Scientific method
Scientific method
Scientific method topicsut
Scientific method topicsut